Sean Compton is a Chicago-based radio and television executive. Compton began his career in radio in 1990. In 1993 he became Program Director of Cincinnati radio station WSAI eventually rising to VP of programming in 1999 for Clear Channel Radio and Premiere Radio Networks. Compton left Clear Channel radio in 2008 to join Tribune Broadcasting as President of television programming. In 2019 Nexstar acquired Tribune Broadcasting and created a networks division headed by Compton.

Compton currently serves as President of Nexstar Networks which includes the CW Network, NewsNation, Antenna TV and Rewind TV, WGN Radio, The Hill (newspaper), and programming content Acquisitions for Dallas-based Nexstar Media Group. 

In January 2020, Nexstar announced it was launching "NewsNation" a Chicago based national primetime news program on cable network WGN America with Compton at the helm. The network program, which launched September 1st 2020, is touted as news absent of bias and will compete with Fox News Channel, CNN and MSNBC. Originally launching with three hours in primetime, NewsNation has now expanded to eleven hours live Monday through Friday. In addition to news, NewsNation offers talk shows with hosts Chris Cuomo, Dan Abrams, Ashleigh Banfield, Elizabeth Vargas and Leland Vittert.

Compton is the son of the late radio DJ and talk show host Dale Sommers.

References

https://www.latimes.com/entertainment-arts/business/story/2020-01-15/nextstar-will-launch-a-prime-time-newscast-on-cable-network-wgn-america-this-fall

Living people
1974 births
American entertainment industry businesspeople
People from Connersville, Indiana